The 37th Filmfare Awards South Ceremony honouring the winners of the best of South Indian cinema in 1989 is an event held at the Kamaraj Memorial Hall, Madras 12 August 1990. The winners list announced on 13 June 1990.

Awards

Main awards

Kannada cinema

Malayalam cinema

Tamil cinema

Telugu cinema

Special  Awards

References

 Filmfare Magazine August 1990

External links
 
 

Filmfare Awards South